Street Talk is a 2005 album by Hip Hop producer Show, released with his crew D.I.T.C. The album is produced by Show and Lord Finesse, and features appearances from Big L, Big Pun, M.O.P., Fat Joe, O.C., A.G. and Party Arty and D-Flow of the Ghetto Dwellas.

Track listing

References

2005 albums
Showbiz and A.G. albums
Albums produced by Showbiz (producer)
Albums produced by Lord Finesse